Sisillius II (Welsh: Seisyllt map Kyhylyn) was a legendary king of the Britons as recounted by Geoffrey of Monmouth.

Legendary account
Sillius II was the son of King Guithelin and Queen Marcia, succeeded by his son Kinarius. Since his father, Guithelin, died when Sisillius was just seven years of age, his mother, Queen Marcia ruled Britain for about five years in his stead as Queen regent. Upon her death, Sisillius came to the throne, ruling for the next six years.

His reign was followed by those of his sons Kinarius and Danius.

References

Legendary British kings